Ciara Lucey is a camogie player, winner of an All-Star award in 2005.

One of just three Dublin players to win awards in the history of the scheme, she was play-maker as Dublin won the All-Ireland Junior Camogie Championship in 2005 for the first time in 30 years.

Lucey's great grandfather, Séamus Gardiner, was President of the GAA from 1943 to 1946. Her father, Peter Lucey, was manager of the Dublin team that won the 2005 All-Ireland Junior Camogie Championship. Her sister, Emer Lucey has also played senior camogie with Ballyboden St Enda's and Dublin.

References

External links
 Profile in Cúl4kidz magazine
 RTÉ radio interview with Ciara Lucey ahead of 2005 junior final

Living people
Year of birth missing (living people)
Ballyboden St Enda's camogie players
Dublin camogie players
UCD camogie players